Kurli is a village which is to the south of Pulivendula in Talupula mandal of Anantapur district in the state of Andhra Pradesh in India.

Geography 

Demographics
According to Indian census, 2001, the demographic details of Kurli village is as follows:
 Total Population: 	3,412 in 866 Households
 Male Population: 	1,717 and Female Population: 	1,695
 Children Under 6-years of age: 421 (Boys - 	208 and Girls - 213)
 Total Literates: 	1,438

References

Villages in Anantapur district